Bransford is a surname. Notable people with the surname include:

 John D. Bransford (1943–2022), American psychologist
 John M. Bransford (1901–1967), American politician
 John S. Bransford (1856–1944), American politician
 Wulstan Bransford, 14th century Roman Catholic bishop